Bao Gu (Chinese: 鮑姑,  4th-century), was a Chinese Taoist physician.  She is the daughter of accomplished Taoist practitioner and governor Bao Jing and the wife of Ge Hong who is the author of Baopuzi. She is also known as one of the famous four female physicians in Chinese history, along with Zhang Xiaoniang of Northern Song dynasty, Yi Xu of the Western Han dynasty, and Tan Yunxian, who was active during the Ming dynasty.    She was active during the Eastern Jin dynasty.

References 

4th-century deaths
4th-century Chinese women
4th-century Chinese physicians
Ancient women physicians
Ancient Chinese scientists
Ancient women scientists
Chinese alchemists